Gerald Melzer won his 2nd career ATP Challenger Tour title, beating Axel Michon 4–6, 6–4, 6–0.

Seeds

Draw

Finals

Top half

Bottom half

References
 Main Draw
 Qualifying Draw

Torneo de Mendoza - Singles
Torneo de Mendoza